Intoxicated Man is the first of four albums by Mick Harvey, presenting the songs of Serge Gainsbourg, sung in English. It is followed by Pink Elephants, Delirium Tremens and Intoxicated Women.

Track listing
All tracks composed by Serge Gainsbourg; except where indicated
All lyrics translated by Mick Harvey; except where indicated
"69 Erotic Year (69 Année Érotique)" (translated by Mick Harvey and Katy Beale) – 3:28
"Harley Davidson" – 2:49
"Intoxicated Man" – 2:42
"The Sun Directly Overhead (Sous Le Soleil Exactement)" (lyrics by Mick Harvey and Alain Chamberlain) – 2:59
"Sex Shop" (Gainsbourg, Jean-Claude Vannier) – 3:22
"The Barrel of My 45 (Quand Mon 6,35 Me Fait les Yeux Doux)" (lyrics by Mick and Alain Chamberlain) – 2:15
"Ford Mustang" – 2:21
"Overseas Telegram" (translated by Mick Harvey and Sarah Owen) – 3:47
"New York, U.S.A" (lyrics by Alain Chamberlain) – 2:28
"Bonnie and Clyde" (lyrics by Mick Harvey and Alain Chamberlain) – 4:02
"Chatterton" (lyrics by Alain Chamberlain) – 2:07
"Song of Slurs (Chanson de Slogan)" (Gainsbourg, Jean-Claude Vannier; translated by Mick Harvey and Katy Beale) – 2:44
"Jazz in the Ravine (Du Jazz Dans le Ravin)" (lyrics by Mick Harvey and Alain Chamberlain)  – 2:05
"I Have Come to Tell You I'm Going (Je Suis Venu Te Dire Que Je M'en Vais)" (lyrics by Mick Harvey and Alain Chamberlain) – 2:55
"Lemon Incest" (lyrics by Mick Harvey and Alain Chamberlain) – 1:54
"Initials B.B." – 3:51

Personnel 
Mick Harvey – vocals, guitar, bass guitar, organ, drums, percussion
Anita Lane –  vocals on "69 Erotic Year", "Harley Davidson", "Ford Mustang", "Overseas Telegram", "Bonnie and Clyde" and "Song of Slurs"
Chris Hughes – drums
Hugo Race – rhythm guitar
Robin Casinader - piano
James Cruickshank – organ
David McClymont – bass guitar
Loene Carmen – backing vocals on "New York, U.S.A." and "Initials B.B."
Monica McMahon – backing vocals on "New York, U.S.A." and "Initials B.B."
Bertrand Burgalat – string arrangements, vibraphone
Eleanor Gilchrist, Chris Goldscheider, Jeremy Morris, Nickie Burton, Steve Bentley-Klein – violin
Theresa Whipple - viola
Abigail Trundle - cello
Technical
P.A. Taylor - sleeve layout
Katy Beale - photography

Mick Harvey albums
1995 debut albums
Mute Records albums
Albums produced by Tony Cohen
Albums produced by Victor Van Vugt
Serge Gainsbourg tribute albums